The 2nd Field Artillery Regiment/Field Artillery Battery ParaCommando or 2A was an artillery battalion in the Land Component of the Belgian Armed Forces. The regiment was the field artillery battalion of the 1st Brigade until 2010. In later years, the M109A2 howitzer was replaced by the MO-120 120mm mortar.
2A consisted of 4 batteries:
 Mortar By
 WFS By
 DLOC By
 H&S By

Field Artillery, 2
Airborne units and formations of Belgium
Para-Commando Field Artillery Battery
Educational institutions established in 1973
1973 establishments in Belgium